The following is Sergio Franchi's (April 6, 1926 – May 1, 1990) comprehensive filmography. Regarding his acting roles; these include two musical comedy performance DVDs (also included on his discography), several comedy skits, and the 1983 Tony Awards film.  Also included is his 1969 dramatic role as Tufa in The Secret of Santa Vittoria—a film that won the 1970 Golden Globe Award for "Best Motion Picture - Musical/Comedy." All of the sections are listed with earliest dates first. In addition to his extensive television performances (singing, dancing, comedy, and talk shows), there is a section on television commercials, and a section on archived films.

Feature and television films

Notes
1.  This DVD was part of a German TV serial, "Music Is in the Air" filmed at the Vienna music show "Rendezvous in Vienna."

2.  Film was nominated for 1970 Academy Awards: Best Original Score, Best Film Editing Distributed by United Artists,  © MGM 1969.
Nominated 1970 Golden Globes: Best Director (Stanley Kramer), Best Actor (Anthony Quinn), Best Actress (Anna Magnani), Best Original Score (Ernest Gold), Best Original Song "Stay"
Won 1970 Golden Globe: Best Motion Picture - Comedy!
The film and its major stars were referenced nine separate weeks on Mr. Pop Culture
3.  "The 37th Annual Tony Awards" was broadcast live from New York City's Uris Theater. The theme for the Awards show was "A Tribute to George and Ira Gershwin."

Musical variety television specials
{| class="wikitable"
|-
!Year/Date !! Title !! Information !! Details
|-
| 1-02-64
|
 Victor Borge at Carnegie Hall, ABC
|
 Featuring Victor Borge, Sergio Franchi, Leonid Hambro
|
 Himself - ("It's Now or Never" comedy sketch w/Victor Borge}
 Himself - (sings "Mimi" accompanied with 3 pianos & chorus), "Ay, Ay Maria" accompanied by his guitar, & "Yours is My Heart Alone."
|-
| 2-14-64
|
 The Bob Hope Comedy Special,|
 Featuring Sergio Franchi, Anne Bancroft, Janet Leigh, Julie London
|
 Bob Hope & Sergio Franchi comedy sketch: Two rival opera stars crash on Hollywood Freeway
 Himself - (sings "Marta")
|-
| 6-04-64
|
 Texaco Star Parade, CBS
 Meredith Willson Variety Show|
 First of three Meredith Willson specials
 Featuring Meredith Willson, Rini Willson, Sergio Franchi, Caterina Valente
|
 Himself - (sings "Stella by Starlight", sings & dances to "Chicago" in Italian, &sings "Seventy-six Trombones" (with Rini Willson, & Caterina Valente),backed by four military bandsNote 1
 Sings and dances in duet with Caterina Valente, "To Be A Performer"
|-
| 1-2-66
|
 March of Dimes Telethon, CBS
|
 Featuring Sergio Franchi, Allen & Rossi, Walter Matthau, Dina Merrill, Julius LaRosa
|
 Himself - (sings songs from repertoire)
|-
| 8-18-67
|
 Centennial International, CBC.
 1. Mediterranean Nations|
 Celebrating The Canadian Centennial
 Series of four specials
|
 Starring Sergio Franchi (representing Italy)
 Ivan Romanoff Orchestra & Chorus
|-
| April, 1967
|
 13 Stars For Channel 13, WNDT
|
 Annual Fund-Raiser
|
 Tony Randall hosts Itzhak Perlman, Shirley Verrett, etc.
 Himself - (Singing songs from repertoire)
|-
| 12-05-70
|
 Miss Teenage America Pageant|
 From Ft. Worth, Texas
|
 Himself - (sings "Love is All")
 Texas A&M Singing Cadets (Annual Appearances)
|-
| 1972
|
 Easter Seals (U.S.) Telethon
|
 From Las Vegas,Note 2 Monty Hall as MC
|
 Himself - (songs from repertoire)
|-
| 6-03-74
|
 6th Annual Lions Sight and Hearing Telethon, WGNO
|
Benefit Lions Eye Foundation Medical Center, New Orleans, LA
|
 Himself - featured performer
 Also featuring Frank Sinatra, Jr., Willie Mays, Hank Aaron, Mickey Mantle
|-
| 2-11-81
|
 Musical Comedy Tonight - II, PBS
 (Three Episodes win Peabody Award)
|
 Producer, Sylvia Fine Kaye
 This episode featured 4 Broadway musicals
|
 Franchi & Bonnie Franklin sing scenes from South Pacific Himself - sings "Some Enchanted Evening"
|-
| 3-20-82
|
 All-Time American Songbook, WNDT
|
 Channel 13 Festival 100,000Note 3
|
 Dinah Shore hosts Melba Moore, Sergio Franchi, Bobby Short etc.
 Himself - (singing American pop standards)
|}

Notes
 The military marching bands were composed of 500 California high school band members led by Willson in the production number.
 Telecast from the enormous Convention Hall in the Las Vegas Sahara Hotel
 All-Time American Songbook was a 3-hour special filmed live at the Grand Ballroom of the New York Statler Hotel. It featured songs intrinsic to American pop culture during period 1900–1950. Straight-up vocal performances..no production numbers. The show included works by George Gershwin, Irving Berlin, Hoagy Carmichael, Cole Porter, Fats Waller and Duke Ellington. The special also featured historical film clips of the songwriters performing their own works.

Television show appearances

London, England
 1960 - Startime, ATV - Himself - (sings "Our Concerto")
 1962 - Startime, ATV - Himself, appears with Susan Lane
 1962 - Sunday Night at the London Palladium, ATV - Himself - (sings opera arias)Sergio Franchi Souvenir Program. (Raydell, New York, 1974)
 1962 - Sunday Night at the London Palladium, ATV - Himself - (sings "And This Is My Beloved," & "Core 'ngrato")

American Television

 1962 - The Ed Sullivan Show, CBS:
Episode dated 10-14-62 - Himself - (sings "Core 'ngrato")
Episode dated 10-28-62 - Himself - (sings "Funiculi, Funicula," & "What Kind of Fool Am I"
 1963 - The Ed Sullivan Show, CBS:
Episode dated 1-19-63 - Himself - (sings "And This Is My Beloved," & "Marechiare")
Episode dated 5-26-63 - Himself - (sings "'O Surdato 'Nnamurato")
 1964 - The Hollywood Palace, ABCNote 1
Host: George Burns, Episode dated 3-28-64 - Himself - (sings "Summertime in Venice"
Himself - (Tap dances and duets w/George Burns to "Some of These Days")
Host: Donald O'Connor, Episode dated 10-10-64 - Himself - (sings "More," & "Core 'ngrato")
Host: Van Johnson, Episode dated 12-23-64 - Himself - (sings "In The Still of The Night," & "Al Di La")
 The Jack Paar Show, NBC - Episode dated 4-24-64 - Himself - (sings "Chicago" in Italian
 1965 - The Ed Sullivan Show, CBS:
Episode dated 3-28-65 - Himself - (sings "Stella by Starlight"). From Broadway's "Do I Hear a Waltz?," co-star Elizabeth Allen sings title song; Franchi sings "Take The Moment."
Episode dated 12-29-65 - Himself - (sings "The Lord's Prayer," medley of "Mimi"/"Maria"/"Everything")
 American Musical Theatre, (TV Series) WCBS - Episode dated 4-24-65 - Himself - Host Earl Wrightson interviews Richard Rodgers, Elizabeth Allen, and Franchi re musical Do I Hear a Waltz? Allen and Franchi sing songs from the Broadway show.
 The Merv Griffin Show, WNEW - Episode dated 5-11-65
 Fanfare (1965)(TV Series) CBS - Episode 9 dated 8-21-65 - Himself - (sings "It Only Takes a Moment," "Chicago" in Italian, & "Take the Moment")
 1966 - The Ed Sullivan Show, CBS:
Episode dated 10-16-66 - Himself - (sings "Core 'ngrato;" duet with the Kessler Twins, "The Shadow of Your Smile")
 The Hollywood Palace, ABCNote 1
Host: Phil Harris, Episode dated 1-15-66 - Himself - (sings Italian version of "Hello, Dolly!")
Host: Phil Silvers, Episode dated 9-24-66 - Himself - (sings "The Impossible Dream," & "Volare")
 The Sammy Davis, Jr. Show, NBC - Episode dates 4-14-66 - Himself - (sings "Be My Love," & "This Dream.")
 The Mike Douglas Show, CBS:
Episode dated 5-11-66
Episode dated 6-29-66
Co-Host week of 12-26-66 through 12-30-66
 The Merv Griffin Show, WNEW - Episode dated 6-14-66
 The Danny Kaye Show, CBS - Show aired 12-14-66 - Himself - (sings; plays comedy sketch with Danny about odd opera lyrics)
 The Dean Martin Show, NBC - Episode dated 12-29-66 - Himself - (sings "C'est Magnifique," & "Climb Every Mountain")
  n.d.  - What's My Line? - Unknown date - Himself - Mystery Guest
1967 - The Ed Sullivan Show, CBS:
Episode dated 3-05-67 - Himself - Audience Bow
Episode dated 3-26-67
Episode dated 10-01-67 - Himself - (sings "Time Alone Will Tell," & "By Myself")(Medley of 5 songs with Peggy Lee & Nancy Sinatra)
 The Joey Bishop Show (talk show), ABC - Episode dated 5-01-67
 Gypsy Rose Lee (Morning Talk Show) KGO-TV - Episode dated July 4, 1967 - Himself - Discusses his background
 The Hollywood Palace, ABCNote 1
Host: Sid Caesar, Episode dated 11-07-67 - Himself - (sings "The Girl From Ipanema," & "I Should Care")
 The Mike Douglas Show, CBS - Episode dated 11-20-67
 1968 - The Jerry Lewis Show - Episode dated 1-02-68 - Comedy sketch with Jerry Lewis & Nanette Fabray)
Himself - (sings "Time Alone Will Tell," & "The Daughter of Rosie O'Grady")
 The Ed Sullivan Show, CBS:
Episode dated 2-04-68 - Himself - (sings "And This Is My Beloved," "Till There Was You," & "Younger Than Springtime")
Episode dated 3-03-68
Episode dated 4-14-68 - Himself - (sings "Hatikvah")
Episode dated 6-09-68 - Himself - (sings "You'll Never Walk Alone" with Welsh Choir)
Episode dated 9-29-68 - Film of Ed on location in Italy interviewing Sergio Franchi & Virna Lisi during the filming of The Secret of Santa Vittoria The Hollywood Palace, ABC
Hosts: Jimmy Durante / The Temptations, Episode dated 2-17-68 - Himself - (no program available)
 1969 - The Hollywood Palace, ABCNote 1
Host: Jimmy Durante, Episode dated 1-11-69 - Himself - (duet w/Jimmy Durante,"E, Compari"); Himself - (sings "E lucevan le stelle" from Tosca, sings & dances to "Alexander's Ragtime Band")
 The Ed Sullivan Show, CBS:
Episode dated 2-02-69 - Himself - (sings "Hava Nagila," & "If I Were a Rich Man")
Episode dated 8-17-69 - Himself - (sings "Love Finds the Way," "A Man Without Love," "Noche de Ronde,"
"Serenata," & "For Once in My Life")
Episode dated 11-30-69 - Himself - (sings "Granada," & "The Song of Santa Vittoria (Stay)")
Ed shows filmed scene of Ed & Sergio passing wine bottles w/villagers in "Santa Vittoria"
 The Mike Douglas Show, CBS:
Episode dated 2-14-69
Co-Host week of 5-26-69 through 5-30-69
 The Tonight Show Starring Johnny Carson, NBC:
Episode dated 4-08-69
Episode dated 6-29-69
Episode dated 9-22-69
 The Joey Bishop Show (talk show), ABC:
Episode dated 3-11-69
Episode dated 10-20-69 - Coverage of World Premiere of "Santa Vittoria" - Himself - Interviewed at premiere
Episode dated 11-04-69
 Profiles, Larry King(TV Series) - Episode dated 1969 - Himself - Interviewed about life and career.
 That Show, Joan Rivers Note 2 - Episode Dated 10-18-69
 1970 - The Ed Sullivan Show, CBS"
Episode dated 2-01-70 - Himself - (sings "To Give," & "Noche de Ronde" w/guitar)
Episode date 4-12-70 - Himself - (sings "More Than Strangers," & "L-O-V-E")
Episode dated 5-24-70 - Himself - (sings "Love is All," & "Al Di La")
Ed introduces Yvonne Franchi, who takes audience bow)
Episode dated 6-14-70 - Himself - (sings "Didn't We?" "With a Little Help From My Friends")
Comedy sketches with Stiller and Meara
 The Hollywood Palace, ABCNote 1
Host: Bing Crosby, Episode dated 1-03-70 - Himself (sings "The Song of Santa Vittoria (Stay)," & "To Give;"
Himself- duet w/Mary Costa.. "True Love"); Group sing medley of Bing Crosby hits
 The David Frost ShowEpisode dated 2-19-70
Episode dated 10-20-70
 Della, Della Reese (talk show), Episode dated 1-27-1970
 The Tonight Show Starring Johnny Carson, NBC - Episode dated 3-09-70
 The Merv Griffin Show, WNEW - Episode dated 3-29-70
 The Tonight Show Starring Johnny Carson, NBC - Episode dated 7-16-70
 The Mike Douglas Show, CBS - Episode dated 7-17-70
 The Real Tom Kennedy Show (1970) - Episode dated 9-6-70
 The Linkletter Show - (Art Linkletter Series 1952-1970) - Episode dated 9-15-70 - Himself (with Dana Valery)
 The Dick Cavett Show - Episode dated 10-06-70
 1971 - The Ed Sullivan Show, CBS:
Episode dated 1-03-71 - Himself - (sings medley of  "Jean"/"Just Say I Love Her;" medley of "Mi Quando"/"All of My Life")
Episode dated 1-24-71 - Himself - (sings "Close to You;" & "No Man is an Island" w/Texas A&M Singing Cadets)
 The Tonight Show Starring Johnny Carson, NBC:
Episode dated 4-08-71
Episode dated 5-10-71
Episode dated 7-16-71
 The David Frost Show - Episode dated 5-12-71
 The Mike Douglas Show, CBS:
Episode dated 5-31-71
Episode dated 11-26-71The Merv Griffin Show, WNEW:
Episode dated 6-17-71
Episode dated 11-2-71
 1972 - The David Frost ShowEpisode dated 3-15-72
Episode dated 7-16-72
 The Mike Douglas Show, CBS:
Episode dated 2-07-72
Episode dated 12-04-72
 The Tonight Show Starring Johnny Carson, NBC - Episode dated 6-22-72
 Saturday Variety - Episode dated 7-08-72The Merv Griffin Show, WNEW:
Episode dated 11-13-72 (From Las Vegas)
Episode dated 12-10-72 (International Music Theme)
 The Julie Andrews Hour, ABC - Episode dated 12-20-72 (Christmas Special)
 1973 - The Julie Andrews Hour, ABC - Episode dated 2-17-73
Himself - (Godfather medley: "Speak Softly Love" & "I Have But One Heart";); and "Ol' Man River;"
Duet with Julie Andrews, "My Heart at Thy Sweet Voice;"
Duet with Julie Andrews, medley of "The Song is You"/"The Way You Look Tonight.")
 Jack Paar Tonite, Note 3 ABC:
Episode dated 4-04-73
Episode dated 9-19-73
 Dinah's Place - Episode dated 4-24-73
 The Mike Douglas Show, CBS:
Episode dated 8-17-73
Episode dated 8-31-73
 The Merv Griffin Show, WNEW - Episode dated 5-27-73
 1974 - The Mike Douglas Show, CBS:
Co-Hosts week of 1-14-74 through 1-18-74
Episode dated 4-16-74
Episode dated 7-26-74
Episode dated 12-27-74
 The Merv Griffin Show, WNEW:
Episode dated 5-12-74
Episode dated 5-31-74 (From Las Vegas)
Episode dated 12-25-74 (From Las Vegas)
 1975 - The Merv Griffin Show, WNEW - Episode dated 4-06-75
 1976 - Dinah! (Dinah Shore talk show) - Episode dated 5-13-76 (From Las Vegas) - Himself - (sings "Nel Blu di Pinto di Blu,"
& "What I Did For Love")
 The Mike Douglas Show, CBS:
Co-Hosts week of 6-21-76 through 6-25-76 - Himself - (sings "Let Me Try Again")
Episode dated 9-02-76 - Himself - (sings "I Only Have Eyes For You")
Episode dated 11-24-76
 The Merv Griffin Show, WNEW - Episode dated 4-07-76
 1977 - 26th Annual Columbus Day Parade - Event Dated 10-10-77 – himself – grand marshal Note 4
 1978 - The Mike Douglas Show, CBS - Episode dated 3-28-78
 The Merv Griffin Show, WNEW:
Episode dated 5-07-78 (From Las Vegas)
Episode dated 10-08-78
Episode dated 12-17-78
 1979 - The Merv Griffin Show, WNEW - Episode dated 6-08-79 (From Las Vegas)
 1981 - Tomorrow (TV series) with Tom Snyder - Episode dated 1-27-81 - Himself - (sings medley of songs with Dana Valery)
 1984 - The Merv Griffin Show, WNEW - Episode dated 5-27-84
 1985 - The Merv Griffin Show, KTTV - Episode dated 11-6-85 
 1987 - NBC Today Show - Episode dated 5-05-87 - Himself w/Juliet Prowse discuss their up-coming show at Westbury Music Fair.
 1988 - Live! with Regis and Kathie Lee, WABC - Episode dated 12-4-88
 1989 - Live! with Regis and Kathie Lee, WABC - Episode dated 7-4-89 - (Independence Day festivities in NY Harbor aboard the New York Princess)

Notes
1.  Eight of the nine episodes of "The Hollywood Palace" in which Sergio Franchi appeared have been digitalized and sold as DVDs in the past. It is unknown if the 2-17-68 episode co-hosted by Jimmy Durante & The Temptations was digitalized. His appearance was verified by a photograph with The Temptations. These video episodes are hard to find today, but constitute a valuable visual resource for Franchi performances.

2.  Commonly referred to as "The Joan Rivers Show" during its airing dates, this was her (1968–1969) syndicated daytime talk show.
Franchi's appearance on this show was prior to their successful concert appearances together in Chicago (1970) and Las Vegas (1974–1976).

3.  The "Jack Paar Tonite Show" was part of "ABC Wide World of Entertainment," and monthly segments lasted one-and-half hours.

4.  Broadcast live from New York City Channel 11 - Joe Caputo, commentator

Television commercials

 1976 — Chrysler Corporation — Franchi was chosen to be the TV spokesperson for the introduction of their Plymouth Volare.
 1976 — Hills Brothers Coffee — Franchi was hired as "the man from Italy" to promote their European coffees on television.

Archived films
1957 - Giacomo Puccini's Madama Butterfly - Film Archives of South African Broadcasting Corporation (SABC)
 Produced by Alessandro Rota
 Jerome Schulman conductiong SABC Orchestra
 Sergio Franci Galli, Bob Borowsky, Nellie du Toit, Rita Roberts

1963 - Producers Library Service
 Himself - 1963 Coconut Grove Debut w/Juliet Prowse (no audio)

1969 - Historic Films Archive (Excluding Ed Sullivan Collection)
 Himself - (sings "A Man Without Love")
 Himself - Interview (no details)
 Himself - (sings "Senorita")
 Himself - (sings "The Impossible Dream")
 Himself - (sings "To Life" from Fiddler on the Roof)

 1974 - Historic Films Archive * Himself - (sings "Love Is All" - live)
 * Himself - (sings "A Woman in Love" - live)
 * Himself - (interviews fan from audience)
 * Himself - (sings "Speak Softly Love," theme from The Godfather'' - live)
 * Himself - (sings "I Have But One Heart" - live)

References

External links 
 Official Website
 Sergio Franchi on IMDb
 WorldCat Holdings for Sergio Franchi
 Library of Congress Audio Holdings for Sergio Franchi
 Sergio Franchi at TV Guide
 Sergio Franchi on Discogs.com
 Sergio Franchi at Allmusic.com
 Sergio Franchi on MusicBrainz

Male actor filmographies
American filmographies